Kolhapur is a city on the banks of the Panchganga River in the southern part of the Indian state of Maharashtra. 

Kolhapur, an epitome of beauty and richness in the Indian state of Maharashtra, stands tall as one of the most significant cities in South Maharashtra. With its rich cultural heritage, this city has been a hub of historical, religious, and cultural activities for centuries. Its historic significance can be traced back to the 1st century BC and continues to amaze visitors with its intricate carvings and magnificent temples. Kolhapur is famous for its unique food culture, including its signature Kolhapuri cuisine, that tantalizes the taste buds of locals and tourists alike. Sports, arts and local dialects also play a major role in defining the identity of the city, making it a true representation of diversity and unity. The city is situated in the western part of Maharashtra and is often referred to as "Dakshin Kashi" or "Mahateerth". It boasts a rich history, which has given it various other names, including Kollagiri, Kolladigiripattan and Kollpur, all meaning "valley". The vibrant and rich city of Kolhapur is indeed a cultural treasure, waiting to be explored by those in search of a true taste of India.

Kolhapur district. Around 2 C.E. Kolhapur's name was 'Kuntal'.

Kolhapur is known as 'Dakshin Kashi' or Kashi of the South because of its spiritual history and the antiquity of its shrine Mahalaxmi, better known as Ambabai. The region is known for  the production of the famous hand-crafted and braided leather slippers called Kolhapuri chappal, which received the Geographical Indication designation in 2019. In Hindu mythology, the city is referred to as "Karvir."

Before India became independent in 1947, Kolhapur was a princely state under the Bhosale Chhatrapati of the Maratha Empire. It is an important center for the Marathi film industry.

Etymology
Kolhapur is named after Kolhasur, a demon in Hindu History. According to History, the demon Kolhasur renounced asceticism after his sons were killed by God for harassing people, and prayed to Mahalakshmi that she would leave the area to him for a hundred years. He committed numerous crimes until the goddess returned after the hundred years were over and killed him for his sins. The dying wish of Kolhasur was to name the place after him, which was granted and the place was named Kolhapur. Kolha stands for Kolhasur and pur, a Sanskrit word, means "city".

History

Medieval era
The Shilahara family founded a dynasty at Kolhapur about the time of the downfall of the Rashtrakuta Empire, that ruled over southern Maharashtra including the modern districts of Satara, Kolhapur and Belagavi (Karnataka). Their family deity was the goddess Ambabai, whose blessing they claimed to have secured in their copperplate grants (Mahalakshmi-labdha-vara-prasada). Like their relatives of the northern branch of Konkan, the Shilaharas of Kolhapur claimed to be of the lineage of Vidyadhara Jimutavahana, a Jain scholar. Their banner featured a golden Garuda. One of the many titles used by the Shilaharas was Tagarapuravaradhisvara, supreme sovereign ruler of Tagara.
 
The first capital of the Shilaharas was probably at Karad during the reign of Jatiga II, as known from their copper plate grant of Miraj and 'Vikramankadevacharita' of Bilhana. Hence, they are referred to sometimes as the 'Shilaharas of Karad'. Later, although the capital was shifted to Kolhapur, some of their grants mention Valavada and the hill fort of Pranalaka or Padmanala (Panhala) as the places of royal residence. Karhad retained its significance during the Shilahara period. This branch rose to power in the latter part of the Rashtrakuta rule and unlike the kings of the other two branches, this branch does not allude to the genealogy of the Rashtrakutas even in their early grants. They acknowledged the suzerainty of the later Chalukya dynasty for some time. They had used Kannada as an official language as can be seen from their inscriptions. The branch held southern Maharashtra from circa 940 to 1220.
 
From 940 to 1212 CE, Kolhapur was the centre of power of the Shilahara dynasty. An inscription at Terdal states that the king Gonka (1020 - 1050 CE) was bitten by a snake then healed by a Jain monk. Gonka then built a temple to Lord Neminath, the twenty-second Jain tirthankara (enlightened being). From this era, Jain temples in and around Kolhapur are called Gonka-Jinalaya.

Around 1055 CE, during the reign of Bhoja I (Shilahara dynasty), a dynamic Acharya (spiritual guide) named Maghanandi (Kolapuriya) founded a religious institute at the Rupanarayana Jain temple (basadi). Maghanandi is also known as Siddhanta-Chakravarti, meaning the great master of the scriptures. Kings and nobles of the Shilahara dynasty such as Gandaraditya I, who succeeded Bhoja I, were disciples of Maghanandi.

Kolhapur was the site of intense confrontation between the Western Chalukya Empire and Rajadhiraja Chola and his younger brother Rajendra Chola II of the Chola empire. In 1052 CE, following the Battle of Koppam, the victor, Rajendra Chola II, marched on to Kolhapur and erected a jayastambha (victory pillar).

Between 1109 and 1178 CE, the Kopeshwar temple to Lord Shiva was built by Shilahara kings, Gandaraditya I, Vijayaditya, and Bhoja II in Khidrapur, Kolhapur.

Kolhapur State

The state of Kolhapur was established by Tarabai in 1707 in the midst of a succession dispute over the Maratha crown. The Maratha throne was then occupied by descendants of Tarabai. One of the prominent Kings was Rajarshi Shahu Maharaj (Shahu of Kolhapur). In his reign, he promoted free education to people of all castes, religions and fought against untouchability. The state was annexed by the British in the 19th century. After India's independence in 1947, the Maharaja of Kolhapur acceded to the Dominion of India on 14 August 1947 and merged with Bombay State on 1 March 1949. Kolhapur is sometimes found spelled as Colapore. Often, Kolhapur is also referred as Dakshin Kashi or the Kashi of the South, due to its rich religious history.

Scriptural references

Kolhapur is mentioned in the Devi Gita, the final chapter of the Devi-Bhagavata Purana, a text of Shaktism. Kolhapur is noted as a place of Kollamma worship. In the text, Devi says,
"O King of Mountains! Still I am now telling something out of My affection to My Bhaktas. Hear. There is a great place of pilgrimage named Kollapura in the southern country. Here the Devi Ambabai always dwells."

Geography

Within Maharashtra, Kolhapur's nearest cities and towns are Ichalkaranji , Jaysingpur ,Kodoli , Peth Vadgaon  Kagal , Kasaba Walva , Satara . Tambraparni river dam near Umgaon village is close by, as also are Radhanagari and Kalambawadi dams. Panhala  and Jyotiba Temple  are in the vicinity of Kolhapur too.

Climate

Kolhapur's climate is a blend of coastal and inland elements common to Maharashtra. Summer in Kolhapur is comparatively cooler, but much more humid, than neighbouring inland cities.

The city receives abundant rainfall from June to September due to its proximity to the Western Ghats. The heavy rains often lead to severe flooding during these months. 2005, 2006, 2019 and 2021 were years when floods occurred.

Kolhapur experiences winter from November to February. The winter temperatures are warmer than other cities in Maharashtra such as Pune and Nashik. Lows range from  while highs are in the range of  due to its high elevation and being adjacent to the Western Ghats. Humidity is low in this season making the weather pleasant.

Hydrology
The Panchganga River originates in the Western Ghats. It has five tributaries which supply the city and surroundings - the Bhogavati, Tulsi, Kumbhi, Kasari and Dhamani rivers. Kolhapur has a number of lakes. The Rankala Lake was once a stone quarry.

The Kalamba lake was built in 1873. These two lakes provide the city with domestic potable water.

Governance

Kolhapur is governed by the Kolhapur Municipal Corporation (KMC). The city is divided into five wards, named with the letters A to E. The corporation provides services such as sewage treatment and free cremation for residents and has made a number of improvements, for example, the Kolhapur Road Project, the Anti-Encroachment Drive to stop illegal building activity encroaching on the city's open spaces, and the Suvarna Jayanti Nagarotthan Project to improve roads and storm water management. The KMC faces problems like the civic limits of Kolhapur city which have not expanded since 1972, due to which the city cannot benefit from various government schemes.

The Kolhapur Municipal and Regional Development Authority was established on 16 August 2017. This authority to manage Kolhapur city and 42 villages around it was formed for the balanced development of Kolhapur city and the neighbouring villages.

Demographics
As per the 2011 Census of India, the population of Kolhapur city is 549,236 and that in 'Kolhapur Municipal and Regional Development Authority' is 561,837. Kolhapur has one of the highest Human Development Index ratings among Indian districts, at 0.770 in 2011.

Religion
 Hindu – 460,774 (83.89%)
 Muslims – 59,760 (10.88%)
 Jain – 18,420 (3.35%)
 Christian – 5,251 (0.96%)
 Buddhist – 2,929 (0.53%)
 Not Stated – 1,289 (0.23%)
 Sikh – 581 (0.11%)
 Others – 232 (0.04%

Economy

Manufacturing Industry and MIDC
Kolhapur has a higher per capita domestic product than the state's average. It has auto-ancillary, foundry and casting industrial establishments which act as supporting units for industries in Sangli, Satara, Pune and Bangalore.
MIDC area like -
 Shiroli
 Kagal 
 Gokul shirgaon
 Shivaji Udyamnagar, kolhapur
situated in Kolhapur.
 
Kolhapur is also an industrial city with approximately 300 foundries generating exports with a value of 15 billion rupees per year. A manufacturing plant of Kirloskar group kirloskar Oil Engines Limited [KOEL] is set up in the MIDC at Kagal near Kolhapur, as is the Raymond clothes plant. Kolhapur has two more industrial areas, Gokul-Shirgaon MIDC and Shiroli MIDC. Shivaji Udyamnagar is an industrial area in the city with a rich entrepreneurial tradition of more than 100 years and specializing in oil engines.

The city is the home of Kolhapuri chappal, a hand-crafted buffalo leather slipper that is locally tanned using vegetable dyes. Kolhapuri slippers are sold on Mahadwar road. Other handicrafts include hand block printing of textiles, silver, bead and paste jewellery crafting, pottery, wood carving and lacquerware, brass sheet work and oxidised silver artwork, and lace and embroidery making.

Kolhapuri jewelry includes a type of necklace called Kolhapuri saaj, patlya (two broad bangles), chinchpeti (choker), tanmani (short necklace), nath (nose ring), and bajuband (an amulet).

Tourism
The Bombay Gazetteer recorded almost 250 temples in the region of which 6 - Ambabai, Temblai, Vithoba, Mahakali, Phiranga and Yallamma temples - are considered the most prominent. Tourism is an important source of revenue with about three million annual visitors. Kolhapur's attractions include: 
Mahalakshmi Temple, Kolhapur
Jyotiba Temple
Panhala Fort
Kaneri Math
New Palace 
Temblai temple complex
 Rankala Lake
 The Tara Rani equestrian statue
 An  idol of the Lord Ganesh at the Chinmaya Mission (Top-Sambhapur). 
The Kolhapur Maybach car of the chhatrapatis of Kolhapur is displayed to the public during the annual Dusshera procession.

Film industry

On 1 December 1917, the Maharashtra Film Company was established in Kolhapur by Baburao Painter. The city has become the primary centre for the Marathi film industry. Kolhapur plays host to many film festivals, including the Kolhapur International Film Festival. The Kolhapur film city was renovated in 2017.

Cuisine

Kolhapur cuisine includes mutton dishes, Kolhapuri misal, and ethnic meat dishes
The city also lends its name to certain types of food and ingredients, such as Kolhapuri lavangi (chili peppers), Kolhapuri jaggery (cane juice concentrate), Kolhapuri masala (spice mixture) and Kolhapuri chutney (onion garlic chutney) which is a staple in gravies and curries.

Kolhapur cuisine also includes soup-like curries called Pandhara Rassa and Tambda Rassa which are served as a part of a Thali. Pandhara Rassa, which can be loosely translated as white curry, is a soup-like dish made from mutton stock and coconut milk infused with spices like cinnamon, coriander, ginger, and garlic. It is served as an appetizer, and also as a part of the main course. Tambda Rassa, red curry, is a spicier form of the dish made by substituting coconut milk with red chillies.

Media and telecommunication
Kolhapur's main newspaper is the Pudhari. Other Marathi language newspapers include Sakal, Loksatta, Lokmat, Kesari, Saamna, Tarun Bharat, and Punyanagari.

The English language dailies include The Times of India (Kolhapur edition), The Indian Express, Business Standard and The Economic Times.

Kolhapur's FM radio services include Tomato FM (94.3 MHz), Radio Mirchi (98.3 MHz), Radio City (95 MHz), Big FM(92.7 MHz) and All India Radio FM (102.7 MHz).

Sports
Wrestling (known as Kusti in Hindi/Marathi) , Football and Kabaddi are the sports most played in the city.

Kolhapur is known as wrestling capital of India. Kolhapur has a long history of kushti (wrestling) and has produced many wrestlers. The sport flourished during the reign of Shahu of Kolhapur (1894–1922). During this golden age, he built Akharas or Taleems (as they are colloquially called) all over Kolhapur and organized wrestling tournaments, inviting wrestlers from across the Indian sub-continent. Since then, Kolhapur's wrestling culture has been dominated by various Taleems like Gangavesh taleem, Shahupuri taleem, Motibag taleem, etc. More than 70 wrestlers undertake training in each of these.

India's first individual Olympian Khashaba Dadasaheb Jadhav, India's first Hind Kesari Shripati Khanchnale and Rustam-e-Hind Dadu Chougule belonged to Kolhapur.

Chhatrapati Shahu Stadium is a football stadium in Kolhapur. Khasbag Wrestling Stadium, India's largest wrestling stadium is situated in Kolhapur.
B.B. Nimbalkar (former Ranji cricketer), Suhas Khamkar (Mr. Asia, Winner), Virdhawal Khade (Indian Olympian in swimming),  Tejaswini Sawant (Arjuna awardee, world championship gold medalist shooter), Rahi Sarnobat (Arjuna awardee, Asian Gold medalist in shooting), Rucha Pujari (chess - Woman International Master), Shahu Mane also belong to the city. Aniket Jadhav who played the FIFA U-17 World Cup 2017 is from Kolhapur.

Transport

Railway

The Chhatrapati Shahu Maharaj Terminus links Kolhapur via rail to India's major cities with express services to miraj, Sangli, Pune, Mumbai, Bengaluru and New Delhi. A daily shuttle service connects Kolhapur with the main rail hub of Miraj on the Central Railway main line. A daily DEMU local train also runs from Kolhapur to Sangli railway station. 
A new railway route from Miraj via Kolhapur until Vaibhavwadi has been confirmed, which will connect Kolhapur and many other towns with to the Western coastal region of India.

Road
Kolhapur is located on National Highway 4 and National Highway 204. Kolhapur is 55 km from Sangli City and 200 km from Pune. The city has three state transport bus stands: Central Bus Stand (CBS), Rankala Bus Stand and Sambhajinagar Bus Stand. Kolhapur Municipal Transport (KMT) provides local bus services. The CBS of Kolhapur is the busiest bus stand in western Maharashtra with more than 50,000 commutators a day.

Airport

Indigo operates daily flights to Hyderabad Airport and Tirupati Airport as well as three times a week to Ahmedabad Airport. Star Air operates flights three times in a week to Mumbai Airport. Expansion of runway and construction of and airport terminal building is in progress.

The nearest international airports to Kolhapur are Pune International Airport and Goa International Airport.

Education
Kolhapur has educational institutions for engineering, medicine, management studies, pharmaceutical sciences and agriculture. Shivaji University is located in Kolhapur city. There are international schools and a pre-IAS training centre. The pre-IAS training centre is in Rajaram college campus. The admissions to pre-IAS centre are allotted by merit through an entrance exam. The city attracts students form all over India and Africa.

Languages
The Marathi language spoken in Kolhapur has some distinctive adaptations. Women for example will use the masculine gender for verbs. Some syllables in names are uniquely shortened to utter them faster. For example, शंकर becomes शंक्रोबा. Some phrases are unique to the local dialect, and especially popular among the youth, such as 'काय भावा?', 'नाद नाही करायचा', 'काटा कीर्रर्र', 'खटक्यावर बोट', and 'जाग्यावर पल्टी'.

Notable people
 Shahu of Kolhapur - Maharaja and a social reformer.
 Tarabai - Maratha queen and warrior.
 Ramchandra Pant Amatya - One of the Ashta Pradhans of Shivaji.
 Santaji Ghorpade - Maratha warrior and Sarsenapati.
 Bhalji Pendharkar - Award Winning director.
 Nanda - Film actress.
 Sudhir Phadke - Singer and composer.
 Suresh Wadkar - Playback singer.
 Jayant Narlikar - Indian astrophysicist.
 V. Shantaram - Indian filmmaker, film producer and actor.
 Shivaji Sawant - Indian novelist.
 Ranjit Desai - Popular Marathi writer.
 Master Vinayak - Indian actor and film director.
 Suniti Ashok Deshpande - Indian educator, writer, translator and interpreter.
 Leena Nair - CEO of Chanel.
 D. Y. Patil - Indian politician and educator.
 Arun Sarnaik - Actor and singer.
 Dhondutai Kulkarni - Indian classical singer from the Jaipur-Atrauli gharana.
 Govindrao Tembe - Music composer.
 B. B. Nimbalkar - Indian cricketer, best known for his score of 443 not out during the 1948–49 Ranji Trophy.
 Dhananjay Mahadik - Indian politician and former Member of Parliament.
 Chandrakant Patil - Indian politician and Maharashtra BJP president.
 Ramesh Deo - Indian film and television actor.
 Vasantrao Ghatge - Indian entrepreneur, business magnate, industrialist and a professor.
 Jagdish Khebudkar - Marathi littérateur and lyricist of Marathi cinema.
 Ashutosh Gowariker - Indian film director, actor, screenwriter and producer.
 Madhavrao Bagal - Writer, artist, journalist, social reformer, political activist, orator and a freedom fighter.
 Anant Mane - Film director.
 Satej Patil - Politician and Minister of State for home in the Maharashtra Government.
 Padmini Kolhapure - Film actress.
 Shruti Sadolikar - Indian classical singer of the khyal style in the Jaipur-Atrauli gharana.
 Sadashivrao Dadoba Mandlik - Former Member of Parliament and NCP leader.
 Sanjay Mandlik - Member of Parliament and Shiv Sena Leader.
 Bhanu Athaiya - Indian costume designer and painter.
 Sangram Chougule - Body builder, Mr Universe winner (2012), Mr India (6-time winner), Mr Maharashtra (5-time winner).
 Suhas Khamkar - Body builder.

See also
 Bhosale
 Maratha
 Maratha Empire
 Marathi people
 List of Maratha dynasties and states
 Kolhapur Municipal Corporation
 Notable people from Kolhapur

References

Further reading
"The Imperial Gazetteer of India." Oxford at Clarendon Press, 1909 Volume 15. p380 - 387. Accessed at Digital South Asia Library at University of Chicago, Illinois, 7 April 2014.

External links

Kolhapur Municipal Corporation

 
Articles containing potentially dated statements from 2011
All articles containing potentially dated statements
Cities and towns in Kolhapur district
Cities in Maharashtra